The Marshall Thundering Herd women's basketball team represents Marshall University in NCAA Division I college basketball competition. They are a member of the Sun Belt Conference and currently led by head coach Tony Kemper. The Thundering Herd's only NCAA tournament appearance was with an  automatic-bid in the 1997 NCAA Division I women's basketball tournament with a #15 seed in the Midwest region.

Postseason

NCAA tournament results
Marshall has been to the NCAA tournament one time. Their combined record is 0–1.

WNIT results
Marshall has been to the Women's National Invitation Tournament (WNIT) one time. Their combined record is 0–1.

WBI results
Marshall has been to the Women's Basketball Invitational (WBI) two times. Their combined record is 2–2.

References

External links